The following is a list of inland islands of Cambodia. All islands mentioned are either situated in the Tonle Sap Lake,
the Tonle Sap River or the Mekong River. Most islands considerably vary in size over the course of a year, as a result of heavy rains during the rainy season and widespread inundation of the Mekong basin.  Names are romanized according to the UNGEGN United Nations Group of Experts on Geographical Names system.

Islands of Battambang Province

Islands of Kampong Chhnang Province

Islands of Kampong Cham Province

Islands of Kandal Province

Islands of Kratie Province

Islands of Phnom Penh Province

Islands of Pursat Province

Islands of Ratanakiri Province

Islands of Stung Treng Province

See also
 Geography of Cambodia
 List of islands of Cambodia
 Koh Rong

References

Cambodia
Islands, inland